Sequoyah County is a county located in the U.S. state of Oklahoma. As of the 2020 census, the population was 39,281. The county seat is Sallisaw. Sequoyah County was created in 1907 when Oklahoma became a state. It was named after Sequoyah, who created the Cherokee syllabary and its written language.

Sequoyah County is part of the Fort Smith, AR-OK Metropolitan Statistical Area.

History
Archaeological sites within the borders of the present county date to the Archaic Period (6000 BC to 1 AD). A slightly smaller number of sites date to the Plains Village period (1000 to 1500 AD).

French traders came to this area in the 1700s, as they had posts in neighboring present-day Arkansas, part of their La Louisiane colony. Spain claimed the area until 1800, when France under Napoleon re-asserted control. He was making a last effort for French colonization in North America. But he ceded control by selling the Louisiana in 1803, when the United States purchased all French territory west of the Mississippi River.

Until 1816 the powerful Osage Nation dominated this and a much larger territory, reaching to the Mississippi River. With Lovely's Purchase, the US bought some of their land. Under pressure in the Southeast, some Cherokee migrated to the west early, and settled here on land granted by the US. The area was then known as Lovely County, Arkansas Territory.

The US forced removal of the Western Cherokee from Arkansas in 1829, resettling them in Indian Territory: present-day Sequoyah County, Oklahoma. Sequoyah was among the Cherokee who moved into this area, where he built a cabin that still stands. The Dwight Mission was moved to a site on Sallisaw Creek, and it still stands.

In the late 1830s, the US forced Indian Removal of most of the Cherokee in the Southeast from the remainder of their lands. They had to trek under Army escort to Indian Territory, a passage they called the Trail of Tears for its high fatalities and sorrows of leaving their homelands.

The Cherokee Nation established its first capital at a place called Tahlonteskee (Tahlontuskey), near the present town of Gore, Oklahoma. Tahlonteskee remained the capital until 1839, when it was superseded by Tahlequah. It continued as a meeting place for the "Old Settlers," as the Western Cherokee were known.

This area, then known as the Sequoyah District, was dominated by Cherokee who were Confederate sympathizers during the Civil War, as were the majority of the nation. Many of the Cherokee were slaveholders; they also had been told that the Confederates would provide them with a Native American state if victorious in the war. The only combat was on June 15, 1864, when Colonel Stand Watie and his Confederate troops conducted the ambush of the Union steamboat J. R. Williams on the Arkansas River.

Geography

The county is divided between the Ozark Plateau in the north and the Ouachita Mountains in the south. The Cookson Hills are in the northwest part of the county. The Arkansas River forms the southern border. Other major waterways are the Illinois River and Robert S. Kerr Reservoir.

Major highways
Interstate 40 runs east and west through Sequoyah County, while U.S. 59 runs north and south through the county.

Adjacent counties
 Cherokee County & Adair County (north)
 Crawford County, Arkansas (east)
 Sebastian County, Arkansas (southeast)
 Le Flore County (south)
 Haskell County (southwest)
 Muskogee County (west)

National protected areas
 Fort Smith National Historic Site (part)
 Sequoyah National Wildlife Refuge (part)

State protected areas
 Brushy Lake State Park
 Tenkiller State Park

Demographics

As of the census of 2000, there were 38,972 people, 14,761 households, and 10,982 families residing in the county. The population density was 22/km2 (58/mi2). There were 16,940 housing units at an average density of 10/km2 (25/mi2). The racial makeup of the county was 68.12% White, 1.86% Black or African American, 19.64% Native American, 0.22% Asian, 0.03% Pacific Islander, 0.74% from other races, and 9.39% from two or more races. 2.03% of the population were Hispanic or Latino of any race. 95.8% spoke English, 2.1% Cherokee and 1.7% Spanish as their first language.

There were 14,761 households, out of which 34.20% had children under the age of 18 living with them, 58.20% were married couples living together, 11.90% had a female householder with no husband present, and 25.60% were non-families. 22.40% of all households were made up of individuals, and 10.20% had someone living alone who was 65 years of age or older. The average household size was 2.61 and the average family size was 3.05.

In the county, the population was spread out, with 27.40% under the age of 18, 8.20% from 18 to 24, 26.90% from 25 to 44, 24.00% from 45 to 64, and 13.50% who were 65 years of age or older. The median age was 36 years. For every 100 females, there were 97.30 males. For every 100 females age 18 and over, there were 92.50 males.

The median income for a household in the county was $27,615, and the median income for a family was $32,673. Males had a median income of $26,613 versus $19,751 for females. The per capita income for the county was $13,405. About 16.10% of families and 19.80% of the population were below the poverty line, including 24.80% of those under age 18 and 18.10% of those age 65 or over.

Government

The county law enforcement is the Sequoyah County Sheriff's Office. The department patrols all of the county's rural areas and provides at least three investigators in the department. The current sheriff is Larry Lane.

Politics

Communities

City
 Sallisaw (county seat)

Towns

 Gans
 Gore
 Marble City
 Moffett
 Muldrow
 Paradise Hill
 Roland
 Vian

Census-designated places

 Akins
 Badger Lee
 Belfonte
 Blackgum
 Box
 Brent
 Brushy
 Carlisle
 Dwight Mission
 Evening Shade
 Flute Springs
 Hanson
 Liberty
 Long
 Marble City Community (former)
 McKey (former)
 Nicut
 Notchietown
 Pinhook Corner
 Redbird Smith
 Remy
 Short
 Stoney Point
 Sycamore (former)

Unincorporated communities
 Cottonwood
 Foreman
 Redland

NRHP sites

The following sites in Sequoyah County are listed on the National Register of Historic Places:

References

External links
 "Sequoyah County'" Official Website for Sequoyah County Courthouse
 "Sequoyah County'" Encyclopedia of Oklahoma History and Culture
 Oklahoma Digital Maps: Digital Collections of Oklahoma and Indian Territory

 
1907 establishments in Oklahoma
Populated places established in 1907
Fort Smith metropolitan area